Nike Shox is a support system feature in several of Nike’s flagship sneakers, first released in 2000. The design is an arrangement of primarily polyurethane hollow columns in the midsole supporting the shoe's heel. Most models include four circular columns in a square formation to provide stability. Later variations sometimes added one or two additional smaller shox, or changed to triangular or rectangular formations.

Overview
Nike claims that Shox not only absorb impact from heel strike while running, but the company also claims they "spring back" and add more power to a runner's stride. Aside from this alleged boost in speed, the Shox is supposed to provide superior shock absorption with high-tech elastic foam.

The newer Shox series is compatible with "Nike+ technology." The Nike Shox Saya+ is the most recent Shox with this feature. The new Nike Shox Q'Vida Hi shoe is a new woman's "dance boot" implementation of Shox.

Actor Hugh Laurie of Fox's House is said to have 37 pairs of size 12½ Shox that he wears on the show and off set.

Comedian Jerry Seinfeld is also a fan of, and wears Nike Shox.

Some of Nike's best-selling shoes include Shox, like the Shox NZ and Shox Turbo, which are available in different colors. These shoes can be found for customization on NikeID, Nike's online shoe customizing site. There are numerous options like different colors and materials for the Shox, along with custom tags.

On February 17, 2006, BBC News reported that Nike had filed a patent infringement suit against rival Adidas, claiming that a range of their trainers replicated its technology.

Timeline
In 1984, designer Bruce Kilgore began researching the Shox project design. Inspiration for the shoe is said to have come from viewing indoor track sprinters appear to "bounce" after impacting the surface of the track. Nike developers experimented with many materials that were unable to provide the runner with sufficient support and also returning a small portion of energy to the runner following impact with the ground. Ultimately, polyurethane was developed as the key component to the Shox system success.

2000

Nike released the first Shox based shoe. The shoe attracted considerable excitement due in part to the timing of its release. The new millennium energized consumers with hopes for new technologies, which contributed heavily to Nike Shox' early success.

During the 2000 Summer Olympics, the brand saw a tremendous boost in popularity when Team USA's Vince Carter dunked over a 7'2" center from Team France in a pair of Shox BB4 (his first signature shoe with Nike). Carter's dunk would become a major influence on Shox' advertisement strategy.

2004
The release of two popular Shox basketball shoes, the Nike Shox Explosive and the Nike Shox Elevate. The Shox VC IV, Shox signature shoe for Vince Carter, is also released.

2008
Some of the new Shox are compatible with the Nike+iPod feature, particularly the Nike Shox Saya.

2016 
Nike creates an Air Force 1 prototype with Shox cushioning, never released to the public. The proficiency testing sample was then sold by an ex-employee during an eBay auction organised in collaboration with the sneaker collector Jordan Geller, owner of Shoezeum and of the record for the biggest sneaker collection of the world. The shoe is now owned by the Swiss startup Support Your Localz, founded by Andrea Antonacci.

2017
Nike ends production of most designs implementing the Shox feature, albeit Nike Shox shoes continue to be sold in some countries to this day.

2018
Shox Gravity released in January 2018 with tagline, "The 'Boing' is Back". This new model replaces traditional string laces with "Flywire" cable retention.

2019
On June 29, 2019, Nike commemorated Vince Carter's career by re-releasing his first signature shoe, the Shox BB4, in various colorways, including the "Olympics" variant. Vince Carter sported the shoes in different colorways throughout the 2018–19 NBA season and 2019-20 NBA season. Carter famously wore the model during the 2000 Summer Olympics when he pulled off  "le dunk de la mort" ("the Dunk of Death"). The Nike Shox BB4 "Toronto Raptors" White paid homage to Vince Carter's days as a Raptor (he wore a similar colorway during the season) and were released globally August 25, 2019. A "Toronto Raptors" Black pair was released in Canada in April 2020. The Nike Shox BB4 in the original colorway of Black/Metallic Silver/Lapis, debuted by Carter on November 15, 2000, was re-released on September 20, 2019. The shoe worn by Carter in the 2001 NBA All Star Game, a white and varsity red colorway, was re-released on October 11, 2019. Several other colorways that Vince wore on-court throughout his final years in the NBA were also released publicly for a total of 8 variations.

2020

Nike Shox TL made a comeback and is now becoming more popular.  This model has 12 Shox “columns” and is popular in black and white.

See also
 Energy Return System, similar system from Reebok

References

External links
 

Nike brands